Shine is a Burmese singer and musician.

Shine debuted in 2018 with the R&B album Perfect. In 2019, he sang the theme song "Lu Yaung Hsaung" for Christina Kyi's film Now and Ever. In June 2020, he released a self-composed single called "1990," written for his father, who died when Shine was in the eighth grade. In September 2020, he released another popular single, "Existence".

Discography 
 Perfect (2018)
 PERFECT - AG2021 (2021)

Personal life
Hailing from Rakhine State, Shine (born Aung Prae Sone) is of Rakhine descent.

References

External links

21st-century Burmese male singers
Burmese singer-songwriters
Burmese people of Rakhine descent
Living people
1997 births